The 36th World Cup began in October 2001 and ended in March 2002 at the World Cup finals held in Altenmarkt, Austria.  The overall winners were Stephan Eberharter and Michaela Dorfmeister, both from Austria.

The schedule for the 36th World Cup season included a nearly four-week-long break in February for the Winter Olympics in the United States at Salt Lake City, Utah.

This was the first season that colored dye was used on the snow to mark the courses.

Calendar

Men

Ladies

Men

Overall

Downhill

Super G

Giant slalom

Slalom

Combined

Ladies

Overall

Downhill

Super G

Giant slalom

Slalom

Combined

Footnotes

References

External links
FIS-ski.com – World Cup standings – 2002

FIS Alpine Ski World Cup
World Cup
World Cup